A labour union, or trade union, is an organisation of workers.

Labour Union may also refer to:
Labour Union (Poland) or UP, a minor social-democratic political party in Poland
Labour Union (UK), a small socialist political party in the United Kingdom from 1889 to 1893

See also
Union Labour, a banner used in the 1922 Manitoba provincial election in Canada